The white-throated antpitta (Grallaria albigula) is a species of bird in the family Grallariidae. It is found in Argentina, Bolivia, and Peru.

Its natural habitat is subtropical or tropical moist montane forest.

References

white-throated antpitta
Birds of the Yungas
white-throated antpitta
Taxonomy articles created by Polbot